Athymoris aurantiella is a moth in the family Lecithoceridae. It is endemic to Taiwan.

The wingspan is 16–18 mm. The forewings are yellowish white, with irregular markings and patterns. The hindwings are grey.

Etymology
The species name refers to the colour of the head and wings and is derived from Latin auranti.

References

Athymoris
Moths of Taiwan
Endemic fauna of Taiwan
Moths described in 2000